Lance is a given name. Notable people with the name include:

People

Politicians
 Lance Cargill (born 1971), American politician and lawyer
 Lance Eads (born c. 1968), American politician
 Lance White (born 1946), Canadian former politician

Sports
 Lance Alworth (born 1940), American Hall-of-Fame former National Football League player
 Lance Armstrong (born 1971), American former road racing cyclist
 Lance Berkman (born 1976), American former Major League Baseball player
 Lance Briggs (born 1980), American former National Football League player
 Lance Cade (1981–2010), American professional wrestler
 Lance Franklin (born 1987), Australian rules footballer
 Lance Gunn (born 1970), American football player
 Lance Johnson, former Major League Baseball outfielder
 Lance Klusener (born 1971), South African cricketer
 Lance Lenoir (born 1995), American football player
 Lance Macey (1881–1950), New Zealand lawn bowler
 Lance Mackey (1970–2022), American dog musher and dog sled racer
 Lance Macklin (1919–2002), British racing driver
 Lance McCullers Jr. (born 1993), American Major League Baseball pitcher
 Lance McCutcheon (born 1999), American football player
 Lance Moore (born 1983), American football player
 Lance Parrish (born 1956), American former Major League Baseball catcher
 Lance Smith (American football) (born 1963), American National Football League player
 Lance Stephenson, American basketball player
 Lance Storm, ring name of Canadian professional wrestler Lance Evers (born 1969)
 Lance Stroll (born 1998), Belgian-Canadian racing driver
 Lance Whitnall, Australian rules footballer
 Lance Wilkinson (footballer) (1931–2011), Australian rules footballer

Military
 Lance Sijan (1942–1968), United States Air Force fighter pilot posthumously awarded the Medal of Honor
 Lance L. Smith (born 1946), United States Air Force general

Musicians
 Lance Bass (born 1979), American pop musician, member of 'N Sync
 Lance Robertson (born 1965), American musician, DJ, and television presenter

Actors
 Lance Dos Ramos (born 1985), Venezuelan actor
 Lance Gross (born 1981), Ghanaian-American actor, model, and photographer
 Lance Henriksen (born 1940), American actor
 Lance Kerwin (born 1960), American former actor
 Lance LeGault (1935–2012), American actor
 Lance Percival (1933–2015), British actor, comedian and after-dinner speaker
 Lance Reddick (1962–2023), American actor and musician

Others
 Lance Acord (born 1964), American cinematographer
 Lance Burton (born 1960), American professional magician
 Lance Castles (1937–2020), Australian scholar of Indonesian history, economics, and politics
 Lance E. Davis (1928–2014), American economic historian
 Lance Ito (born 1950), judge in the O.J. Simpson murder trial
 Lance Price (born 1958), British writer, journalist and political strategist

Fictional characters
 Kamen Rider Lance, in Kamen Rider Blade
 Lance (Voltron), a member of the Voltron Force
 Lance, an alias of Magog (comics), a DC Comics enemy of Superman
 Lance (Pokémon), the final member of Kanto's Elite Four, and the champion of the Johto region
 Lance, one of Bow's fathers in She-Ra and the Princesses of Power
 Lance Hunter, a Marvel Comics character
 Lance Smart, in the Australian soap opera Home and Away
 Lance St. Lorne, title character of the 1950s American comic strip Lance
 Lance Strongbow, in Tangled: The Series
 Lance Sweets, in the television series Bones
 Lance Vance, in the Grand Theft Auto video game series
 Lance "Ryder" Wilson, in the Grand Theft Auto video game series
 Lance Wilkinson, in the Australian soap opera Neighbours

See also
Lance (surname)
Lance (disambiguation)

English masculine given names